Óscar Alfredo Landerretche Gacitúa (born 18 October 1949) is a Chilean politician who served as minister of State. Similarly, he was president of the board of the Chilean state owned-company Codelco.

References

External links
 Profile at University of Chile

1949 births
Living people
20th-century Chilean economists
Chilean people of Basque descent
21st-century Chilean economists
University of Chile alumni
University of Los Andes (Colombia) alumni
Alumni of the University of Oxford
20th-century Chilean politicians
21st-century Chilean politicians
Socialist Party of Chile politicians